Bad News is the second album by Massachusetts' metalcore band Ligeia.

Track listing
 "Bad News" - 3:42
 "Johnny Cash" - 3:11
 "I've Been Drinkin" - 2:30
 "Hot Mess" - 2:20
 "One Night Stand" - 2:37
 "Teenage Wasteland" - 2:05
 "Interlude" - 1:15
 "Bombshell" - 3:17
 "Heroin Diaries" - 2:52
 "Thanks for Nothing" - 2:43
 "Hoodrat" - 2:28
 "You Suck At Life" - 2:55 (Japanese Bonus Track)

References

2008 albums
Ferret Music albums
Ligeia (band) albums